The Fire Safety Commission (FSC; French: Commission de la sécurité-incendie) is an independent, quasi-judicial agency in Ontario, Canada. It is one of 13 adjudicative tribunals under the Ministry of the Attorney General that make up Tribunals Ontario.

The FSC resolves disputes, conducts case conferences and hearings regarding fire safety.

Authority

The FSC has three related legislations and regulations: The Fire Protection and Prevention Act, Fire Code and Statutory Powers Procedure Act. The FSC resolves disputes and conducts hearings regarding fire safety matters, including orders made by inspectors or the Fire Marshal for repairs, alterations or installations to a building, structure or premises.

References

External links
https://tribunalsontario.ca/fsc/
https://www.ontario.ca/laws

Ontario government departments and agencies